The 2000 season was the New England Patriots' 31st in the National Football League (NFL) and their 41st overall. They finished with a 5–11 record and in last place in the division. It would be the first season the franchise would have involving quarterback Tom Brady. He would play 20 seasons as a Patriot, a franchise record. However, he wasn't given the starting job until next season. This will be Tom Brady's only season on a team with a losing record until 2022.

Following the firing of three-year head coach Pete Carroll in January, Patriots owner Bob Kraft pursued Jets assistant head coach Bill Belichick for the Patriots' head coaching vacancy. Belichick, who had been an assistant coach under Bill Parcells with the Patriots in 1996, followed Parcells to the Jets after that season and was contractually named Parcells' successor. A day after the 1999 season, Parcells resigned as head coach of the Jets and made his second retirement from NFL coaching. Belichick, who had been assistant head coach of the Jets, became the Jets' next head coach. The following day, at a press conference for his hiring, Belichick wrote a resignation note on a sheet of loose-leaf paper ("I resign as HC of the NYJ."), and proceeded to give a half-hour resignation speech to the press. Despite rumors that he had been offered the Patriots' vacant head coaching position, Belichick cited the Jets' uncertain ownership situation following the death of owner Leon Hess earlier that year as the reason for his resignation. The Jets denied Belichick permission to speak with other teams, and as had happened in 1997 with Parcells, the NFL upheld Belichick's contractual obligations to the Jets. Belichick then filed an antitrust lawsuit against the NFL in federal court. After Parcells and Kraft, talking for the first time since Parcells' resignation from the Patriots, agreed to settle their differences, the Patriots and Jets agreed to a compensation package to allow Belichick to become the Patriots' head coach. With the deal, the Patriots sent their first-round pick in the 2000 NFL Draft and fourth and seventh-round picks in the 2001 NFL Draft to the Jets, while also receiving the Jets' fifth-round selection in 2001 and seventh-round pick in the 2002 NFL Draft.

Belichick restructured the team's personnel department in the offseason, and later proclaimed that the team "could not win with 40 good players while the other team has 53," after a number of players showed up out of shape for the start of training camp. The Patriots went on to finish the season 5–11, finishing last in the AFC East and missing the playoffs for the second straight season.
 Beginning with this year, Tom Brady would spend 20 years as the Patriots quarterback until signing with the Tampa Bay Buccaneers in 2020. Coincidentally, the Buccaneers beat the Patriots, 21–16, at Foxboro Stadium in their season opener. This was the only season from 1996 to 2019 where the Patriots finished with a losing record.

Offseason

2000 NFL draft

Staff

Opening training camp roster
As of the Patriots' first training camp practice at Foxboro Stadium on July 17 (practices at Bryant College started on July 23), they had the NFL maximum of 80 players signed to their roster. The Patriots received four roster exemptions for the NFL Europe allocations of Garrett Johnson, Marc Megna, Sean Morey, and Noel Scarlett. Additionally, the Patriots allocated tackle Ed Ellis to NFL Europe and received a roster exemption for him, but he was released before the start of training camp.

Week 1 roster

Final roster

Schedule

Preseason

Regular season

Standings

Notes

References

External links
Season page on Pro Football Reference

New England Patriots
New England Patriots seasons
New England Patriots
Sports competitions in Foxborough, Massachusetts